The Shafer Round Barn near Sioux Falls, South Dakota, United States, is a round barn that was built in 1920.  It was listed on the National Register of Historic Places in 1995.

References

Barns on the National Register of Historic Places in South Dakota
Buildings and structures completed in 1920
Buildings and structures in Minnehaha County, South Dakota
Round barns in South Dakota
National Register of Historic Places in Minnehaha County, South Dakota